Perroux is a surname. Notable people with the surname include:

François Perroux (1903–1987), a noted French economist
Carl'Alberto Perroux (1905–1977), Italian contract bridge official, founder and long-time non-playing captain of the Blue Team, the most successful team in bridge history